The Albemarle–Kenmore Terraces Historic District is a small historic district located in the Flatbush neighborhood of Brooklyn, New York City.  It consists of two short cul-de-sacs, Albemarle Terrace and Kenmore Terrace, off of East 21st Street, and the 32 houses on the two streets, as well as a four-family apartment building at the end of Albemarle Terrace. The New York City Landmarks Preservation Commission, which designated the district as a landmark in 1978, noted that the "terraces are distinguished by the uniform use of materials, height and color producing a harmonious effect".

Architecture 
The structures were designed by the local firm of Slee & Bryson, but differ in style between the two streets.

Albemarle Terrace 
The houses on Albemarle Terrace, built between 1916 and 1917, are Colonial Revival two and one-half- or three-story brick buildings located on courts and raised above street level behind terraces or front gardens. Many of these gardens are shaded by a generous canopy of mature Pin Oak trees. The buildings on Albemarle Terrace have long been praised by architectural critics as "the most fully realized Neo-Federal houses in the city—especially the smaller, gabled houses with dormers—they represent perfect bookends of New York's row house building history stretching from 1783 to 1917".

Kenmore Terrace 
On Kenmore Terrace, three of the houses are also in the Colonial Revival style, one of which was built in 1918 and other two in 1919–20, but the remaining six on the south side of the street show the influence of the Garden city movement, and were designed in the English Arts and Crafts style.  These Kenmore cottages were built in 1918–19, and presage the automobile-based look of many suburbs built in the decades to come, as each house has a driveway leading to a private garage.

Historic designation 
The historic district was designated by the New York City Landmarks Preservation Commission in 1978, and was listed on the National Register of Historic Places in 1983.

Notable surroundings 
Located on Kenmore Terrace, but not part of the historic district, is the landmarked parsonage of the Flatbush Reformed Dutch Church, a two and one-half-story wood-frame house designed in a vernacular style transitional between the Greek Revival and Italianate styles. The parsonage was built in 1853 on the west side of Flatbush Avenue (near present-day 892 Flatbush Avenue), and moved to its present location in 1918.

The historic district is close to a number of other New York City landmarks, such as Erasmus Hall High School, Flatbush Town Hall, Kings Theater, and the now-razed Flatbush District No.1 School (landmarked in 2007, but demolished in 2015) which was built in 1890 atop the site of the Flatbush African Burial Ground. The United States Post Office - Flatbush Station stands across from the site of the former school, and is listed on the U.S. National Register of Historic Places.

Additionally, a handful of non-landmarked architecturally significant buildings stand nearby:

The former Keith-Albee Kenmore Theatre stands at 2101 Church Avenue. It originally opened in 1928 as a vaudeville house, and later became a single screen movie theater, split up into four screens in 1970. The theater is now occupied by retail chain Target, among others. The building was designed by Eugene De Rosa, with its southern elevation adorned with Colonial Revival architectural vernacular similar to the buildings on Albemarle Terrace, as well as the church house of the Flatbush Reformed Dutch Church opposite it. The building that once housed the office of Midwood Associates—the developer of the historic district—still stands at 2127 Church Avenue/882 Flatbush Avenue, with marquees bearing the branding "Midwood Associates Buildings" along the southern and eastern façades.

Transportation 
The historic district is closest to the New York City Subway station at Church Avenue and is accessible via two MTA-operated local bus routes: the B35 on Church Avenue, and the B41 route on Flatbush Avenue.

See also
List of New York City Landmarks
National Register of Historic Places listings in Kings County, New York

References
Notes

External links

Federal architecture in New York City
Flatbush, Brooklyn
Historic districts on the National Register of Historic Places in Brooklyn